Commonly referred as phosphorescence, persistent luminescence is the emission of light by a phosphorescent material after an excitation by ultraviolet or visible light. Such materials would "glow in the dark".

Mechanism
The mechanism underlying this phenomenon is not fully understood. However, the phenomenon of persistent luminescence must not be mistaken for fluorescence and phosphorescence (see for definitions  and ). Indeed, in fluorescence, the lifetime of the excited state is in the order of a few nanoseconds and in phosphorescence, even if the lifetime of the emission can reach several seconds, the reason of the long emission is due to the deexcitation between two electronic states of different spin multiplicity. For persistent luminescence, it has been known for a long time that the phenomenon involved energy traps (such as electron or hole trap) in a material which are filled during the excitation. After the end of the excitation, the stored energy is gradually released to emitter centers which emit light usually by a fluorescence-like mechanism.

Examples of use
Persistent luminescence materials are mainly used in safety signs, watch dials, decorative objects and toys. They have also been used as nanoprobes in small animal optical imaging.

References

See also
 Luminous paint
 Strontium aluminate

Luminescence